Yalow may refer to:

 13915 Yalow, an asteroid
 Rosalyn Sussman Yalow, Nobel Prize-winning American medical physicist